Ainalu (also Romanized as Aīnalū and Īnalū; also known as Anili and Anīlū) is a village in Fuladlui Jonubi Rural District, Hir District, Ardabil County, Ardabil Province, Iran. At the 2006 census, its population was 582, in 95 families.

References 

Tageo

Towns and villages in Ardabil County